The Yawalapiti (also Jaulapiti, Yaulapiti, or Yawalapití) are an indigenous tribe in the Amazonian Basin of Brazil.  The name is also spelled Iaualapiti in Portuguese. The current village Yawalapiti is situated more to the south, between the Tuatuari and Kuluene River. Their population in 2011 was 156, down from a 2010 population of 237 (2010) but up from a low of 25 in 1954.

The Yawalapiti live in the Xingu Indian Park, in Upper Xingu region along with Kiabi, Yudja and Suya tribes. The ways of life of these four tribes are quite similar despite having different languages. Their villages are situated around Lake Ipavu, which is six kilometres from the Kuluene River.

Language
The Yawalapiti language is a Central Maipuran, part of the Maipuran language family, which are Arawakan languages. Yawalapiti is related to the Waurá and Mehináku languages.

Description of villages
Typical to Upper Xingu tribes, the Yawalapiti village is circular in shape and has communal houses surrounding a square (uikúka)  cleared of vegetation. In the center of the square is the men's house: frequented only by the men and where the sacred flutes are stored and played. It is in this house, or at river banks nearby, that the men congregate to talk in the twilight and where they paint themselves for ceremonies.

The men's house is similar to the residential houses.  It only has one or two doors, always smaller than those of residences, which face the center square. The flutes are hung in the beams and during the day they may be played only in the house's interior; at night (after the women have retired) the men can play the flutes in the patio.

History 
The first historical contact between the Yawalapiti and Europeans occurred in 1887, when they had been visited by Karl von den Steinen's expedition. In this period, they were located in the high course of the Tuatuari river, in a region between lagoons and quagmires identified by the Yawalapiti as a small farm. The German anthropologist's impression of these Indians was that of poverty, a people who had insufficient food to offer visitors.

Traditional rituals 

The Quarup or Kuarup ritual is performed to honour the dead tribe members. It is held together with neighbouring tribes.

Notes

Xingu peoples
Indigenous peoples in Brazil
Indigenous peoples of the Amazon

https://www.haaretz.com/world-news/2021-10-22/ty-article-magazine/.highlight/i-attended-an-amazon-tribes-death-rite-heres-what-i-saw/0000017f-e6a4-da9b-a1ff-eeef38550000